Events from the year 2020 in Kosovo.

Incumbents 
 President: Hashim Thaçi
 Prime Minister: Avdullah Hoti

Events 
Ongoing — COVID-19 pandemic in Kosovo
 13 March – The first two cases of COVID-19 in the country were confirmed, a 77-year-old man from Vitina and an Italian woman in her early 20s, who worked in Klina with Caritas Kosova.
 18 March – The interior minister, Agim Veliu was sacked due to his support for declaring a state of emergency to handle the COVID-19 pandemic which would have given power to the Kosovo Security Council chaired by President of Kosovo, Hashim Thaçi.
 25 March – The Kurti cabinet was overthrown by a no-confidence motion initiated in assembly by the ruling partner.
 24 June – The Specialist Prosecutor's Office announces that it has submitted for court approval an indictment against President Hashim Thaçi and nine other former Kosovo Liberation Army fighters alleging that they committed war crimes and crimes against humanity during the Kosovo War. Following the announcement, President Thaçi cancels his upcoming trip to the United States.

Deaths

See also 

 2020 in Europe
 COVID-19 pandemic in Europe

References 

 
Kosovo
Kosovo
2020s in Kosovo
Years of the 21st century in Kosovo